Getting Dressed in the Dark is the debut country music album of artist Jaron Lowenstein, more commonly known as Jaron and the Long Road to Love. It was released on June 22, 2010 via Universal Republic.

The album's first single, "Pray for You", was released in November 2009, and has become a Top 20 single on the Billboard Hot Country Songs chart, as well as a Top 40 single on the Billboard Hot 100. The album's second single, "That's Beautiful to Me" was released on radio on September 7, 2010, but it failed to reach the Top 40. A third single, "It's a Good Thing", was released on April 18, 2011, but it failed to chart.

Content
Lowenstein wrote or co-wrote all of the songs on the album. "It's a Good Thing" was co-written by Sarah Buxton, and Lowenstein's twin brother Evan, with whom he formerly recorded as Evan and Jaron.

Critical reception
Matt Bjorke of Roughstock gave the album a four-star rating, calling each song "well-written and produced country/pop tunes" and a "strong storyteller's album." Giving it two-and-a-half stars, Andrew Leahey of Allmusic thought that the lyrics were "ballsy" by country music standards, but thought that the album's sound was bland and more influenced by pop than country.

Track listing

Personnel
Greg Barnhill - acoustic guitar, background vocals
Robert Blair - drums
Jimmy Dulin - bass guitar, electric guitar, drum loops, percussion, programming, soloist
Mike Durham - electric guitar
Jaron Lowenstein - acoustic guitar, organ, percussion, piano, lead vocals, background vocals
Jason Scheff - piano, background vocals
Rex Schnelle - banjo, acoustic guitar, electric guitar
Paul Scholten - drums, percussion
Randy Smith - bass guitar
Tim Galloway - electric guitar
Jimmy Wallace - keyboards
Danny Wilde - background vocals
Jonathan Yudkin - mandolin, violin

Chart performance
The album debuted and peaked at number 2 on the Billboard Top Country Albums and number 16 on the Billboard 200, selling 23,916 copies in its first week. As of November 2010, the album has sold 110,000 copies in the U.S.

Album

End of year charts

Singles

References

2010 debut albums
Jaron and the Long Road to Love albums
Big Machine Records albums